Gibilrossa is a small town in northern Sicily. It is a frazione of the comune of  Misilmeri, in the province of Palermo.

Geography
It is located at some 400 meters of altitude: the name derives from Arabic and means "great mountain".

History

The town is famous for having been used as a stronghold by the troops of Giuseppe Garibaldi and Nino Bixio for their conquest of Palermo in 1860 during the Expedition of the Thousand. An obelisk in the town commemorates the event.

Notes and references

Frazioni of the Province of Palermo